"Muleta" is a pop song written and recorded by Chilean singer and songwriter Francisca Valenzuela and this song is the fifth official single from her first solo debut studio album, Muérdete La Lengua, released in Chile on October 2, 2008.

Song information
The song was written in 2005 by Francisca Valenzuela, and the single was produced by Mauricio Durán and Francisco Durán members of Chilean Rock band Los Bunkers. The song was released on October 2, 2008 on Radios and October 16, 2008 in Digital Download in this format includes a remix featuring Jorge Gonzalez, member former of Los Prisioneros.

Music video
The official music video for the song "Muleta" was premiered on MTV Latin America on October 7, 2008, later on October 30, 2007 was premiered on Via X and Zona Latina. The music video was directed by Nicolas Mantzer Weisner The video was filmed in New York, United States and shows to Francisca playing a guitar in the New York City Subway,and taking walks in Central Park wearing colorful spring outfits. The music video debuted in MTV Los 10 + Pedidos Latin America and peaked at number 7 so far.

Track listing

CD Single
 "Muleta" (Radio Version) – 3:38
 "Muleta" (Album Version) – 3:42
 "Muleta" (Jorge Gonzalez Remix) – 4:56

Digital Download Single
 "Muleta" (Album Version) – 3:42
 "Muleta" (Jorge Gonzalez Remix) – 4:56

Release history

External links
 
Official Music website 
Official MySpace 
Official Blog
Lyrics of this song – Muleta

2008 singles
2007 songs
Francisca Valenzuela songs
Songs written by Francisca Valenzuela